The 2017 Dynamic Italian Open,
was the first Euro Tour 9-Ball pool event in 2017. The event was won by Germany's Ralf Souquet who defeated Russia's Ruslan Chinachov 9–5 in the final. In winning the event, Souquet won his twenty-second Euro Tour event.

Tournament format
The event saw a total of 187 players compete, in a double-elimination knockout tournament, until the last 32 stage; where the tournament was contested as single elimination.

Prize fund 
The tournament prize fund will be similar to that of other Euro Tour events, with €4,500 for the winner of the event.

Tournament results

References

External links

Euro Tour
Sporting events in Italy
2017 Euro Tour events
2017 in Italian sport
International sports competitions hosted by Italy